Kpodégbé Lanmanfan Toyi Djigla is the 16th king of the Fon State of Allada in central Benin. He rose to the throne on December 2, 1992 and is the first king of the kingdom since the death of King Gi-gla I in 1909. Until 2016 the king of Allada served as the president of the Supreme Council of Kings of Benin. His successor to the presidency is Sébastien Ajavon.

Kpodégbé Toyi Djigla is currently president of the High Council of Kings of Benin. He is married to Queen Djéhami Kpodégbé Kwin-Epo.

See also
List of rulers of the Fon state of Alada
List of current constituent African monarchs

References

21st-century Beninese people
Beninese Ahmadis